Daniel Avery (September 18, 1766 – January 30, 1842) was an American politician and a United States representative from New York.

Biography
Born in Groton in the Connecticut Colony, Avery attended the common schools.

Career
Avery was appointed ensign in the Sixth Company, Eighth Regiment of the Connecticut Militia, and served as lieutenant and captain until May 1794. After moving to Aurora, Cayuga County, New York in 1795, he subsequently became the owner of a large tract of land which was farmed by tenants.

Elected as a Democratic-Republican to represent the 14th district during the Twelfth Congress and the 20th district during the Thirteenth Congress, Avery held the office from March 4, 1811 to March 3, 1815. He was elected to represent the 20th District during the Fourteenth Congress to fill the vacancy caused by the resignation of Enos T. Throop and served from September 30, 1816 to March 3, 1817. He resumed the management of his estate and was connected with the land office at Albany for twenty years.

Death
Avery died in Aurora, Cayuga County, New York, on January 30, 1842 (age 75 years, 134 days). He is interred at Oak Glen Cemetery, Aurora, New York.

References

External links

1766 births
1842 deaths
People from Groton, Connecticut
Democratic-Republican Party members of the United States House of Representatives from New York (state)
People from Aurora, Cayuga County, New York